Sefid Sangan (also Romanized as Sefīd Sangān; also known as Sefīd Sangān-e Lemīr) is a village in Chubar Rural District, Haviq District, Talesh County, Gilan Province, Iran. At the 2006 census, its population was 462, in 99 families.

History 

On May 12, 2020  Reza Ashrafi killed his daughter Romina Ashrafi, a so called "honour killing".

References 

Populated places in Talesh County